Leaf River Wildlife Management Area was established in 1940 out of land owned by the U.S. Forest Service.

Leaf Wilderness
In 1984,  of the Leaf River Wildlife Management Area in southwestern Greene County  were designated wilderness.  Almost the entire Leaf Wilderness consists of meandering sloughs, oxbow lakes, and spruce-pine forest or oak-gum-cypress river bottom.  Loblolly and shortleaf pines are found in abundance, with a dense understory of dogwood, redbud, persimmon, blueberry, honeysuckle, and poison oak.  Common wildlife include white-tailed deer and wild turkey.

See also
List of U.S. Wilderness Areas
Wilderness Act

References

External links
De Soto National Forest Wilderness Areas

Protected areas of Greene County, Mississippi
IUCN Category Ib
Wilderness areas of Mississippi
De Soto National Forest
1940 establishments in Mississippi
Protected areas established in 1940
Wildlife management areas of Mississippi